Sara Ellis may refer to:

 Sara L. Ellis (born 1969), Canadian-born American federal judge in the Northern District of Illinois
 Sara Ellis (White Collar), character on the USA Network TV series White Collar

See also
 Sarah Ellis (author) (born 1952), Canadian writer
 Sarah Stickney Ellis (1799–1872), English writer on women's roles in society